Awilda, also known as Alwilda, was a female pirate. The story of Awilda is doubted by some historical scholars and considered to be a legend.

Legend
Awilda was the daughter of a 5th-century Scandinavian king; referred to in one source as Synardus and a "Gothic king". It is said that the King, her father, had arranged a marriage for her to Alf, the crown prince of Denmark, whose father was King Sygarus of Denmark. However, Awilda refused her father's choice. She and some of her female friends dressed like sailors and commandeered a ship. While sailing, they came across a pirate ship that had recently lost its captain, and the pirates elected Awilda as their captain. The King of Denmark sent his son and a navy ship to battle with the "irksome" pirates.  Prince Alf and his men were able to board their ship and gain the upper hand in the battle. Apparently, Awilda was so impressed with the prince's courage that she revealed her true identity, and agreed to marry Alf. They married on board, and lived happily ever after as King and Queen of Denmark.

Modern versions
Italian poet Torquato Tasso writes his most famous tragedy on her story, called Re Torrismondo, where Alwida is promised in marriage to the king of Sweden, Germondo, but falls in love with Torrismondo, so she decides to commit suicide in order not to choose between love and honor.

See also
 Alf and Alfhild
 International Talk Like a Pirate Day

References

External links
 The Straight Dope bulletin board

Danish pirates
Danish female pirates
Piracy in the Atlantic Ocean
Medieval pirates
Medieval legends
Maritime folklore
Danish folklore